The Early Bird is a 1936 British comedy film directed by Donovan Pedelty and starring Richard Hayward, Jimmy Mageean and Charlotte Tedlie.

Production
The film was made at Highbury Studios and in Northern Ireland. It was a quota quickie produced for distribution by the American studio Paramount Pictures. The film's sets were designed by art director George Provis.

Cast
 Richard Hayward as Daniel Duff  
 Jimmy Mageean as Charlie Simpson  
 Charlotte Tedlie as Mrs. Gordon  
 Myrtle Adams as Lizzie  
 Nan Cullen as Mrs. Madill  
 Elma Hayward as Susan Duff  
 Terence Grainger as Archie Macready 
 Charles Fagan as Harold Gordon

References

Bibliography
 Chibnall, Steve. Quota Quickies: The British of the British 'B' Film. British Film Institute, 2007.
 Low, Rachael. Filmmaking in 1930s Britain. George Allen & Unwin, 1985.
 Wood, Linda. British Films, 1927-1939. British Film Institute, 1986.

External links

1936 films
British comedy films
British black-and-white films
1936 comedy films
Films directed by Donovan Pedelty
Films set in Ireland
Films shot at Highbury Studios
1930s English-language films
1930s British films
English-language comedy films